Mae Charlotte Dahlberg (24 May 1888 – 1969), also known as Mae Laurel, was an Australian-born vaudeville performer and actress. She was Stan Laurel's professional partner and common-law wife from 1917 to 1925.

Childhood and career in Australia 
Dahlberg was born on 24 May 1888 in the inner Melbourne suburb of Brunswick, Victoria, Australia, to Mary Jane (née Gundry) and labourer Louis Dahlberg. By 1905, she had begun to earn a reputation performing as a singer and dancer on the Australian stage, with positive reviews. In 1906, she married baritone and fellow performer Rupert Cuthbert while in Hobart, Tasmania. A child, Rupert Clifton Saxe Cuthbert, was born of the union in 1908, in Melbourne.

In about 1913, Dahlberg and Cuthbert sailed for the United States.

Career in the U.S. 
Dahlberg and Cuthbert's personal and professional relationship apparently did not last. While performing in a "sister act" in California, Dahlberg met and formed a variety act with Stan Laurel. In 1917 she played in a comedy short, Nuts in May, notable as the screen debut of Stan Laurel (credited as Stan Jefferson). Mae Dahlberg is credited as "Mae Laurel" in several of her films.

Though Stan and Mae never married, as professional partners they lived together as common-law husband and wife from 1917 to 1925. Mae maintained that it was she who suggested Stan change his name to Laurel.

By 1924, Laurel had given up the stage for full-time film work under contract with Joe Rock for 12 two-reel comedies. The contract had one stipulation: Dahlberg was not to appear in any of the films. Rock thought her temperament was hindering Laurel's career. In 1925, when she started interfering with Laurel's work, Rock offered her a cash settlement and a one-way ticket back to her Australia, which she accepted. Her last film had been Wide Open Spaces, made for Hal Roach in 1924 with Laurel and fellow Australian Ena Gregory in the leading roles.

Dahlberg returned to the U.S. a few years later, and in November 1937, she sued the now successful Stan Laurel for financial support. The matter was settled out of court. She was described as a "relief project worker" by the court.

Although Dahlberg appears to have lived in Melbourne again for some time during the 1940s, she returned to the United States again. She died in New York in 1969.

Filmography 
 Nuts in May (1917)
 Huns and Hyphens (1918)
 Bears and Bad Men (1918)
 Mud and Sand (1922)
 The Pest (1922)
 When Knights were Cold (1923)
 Under Two Jags (1923)
 Frozen Hearts (1923)
 The Soilers (1923)
 Mother's Joy (1923)
 Near Dublin (1924)
 Rupert of Hee Haw (1924)
 Wide Open Spaces (1924)

References

Bibliography 

 Bergen, Ronald. The Life and Times of Laurel and Hardy. New York: Smithmark, 1992. .

External links 
 

1888 births
1969 deaths
20th-century American actresses
20th-century Australian actresses
20th-century American comedians
20th-century Australian comedians
Actresses from Melbourne
American film actresses
American silent film actresses
American stage actresses
Australian film actresses
Australian silent film actresses
Australian stage actresses
Australian emigrants to the United States
Silent film comedians
Vaudeville performers
People from Brunswick, Victoria